John Firth (1838–1922) was a Scottish folklorist. He was born in Redland on Mainland, Orkney. He worked as a joiner and wheelwright and had a workshop in the village of Finstown, in the parish of Firth. He wrote Reminiscences of an Orkney Parish.

References

Firth,John
Firth,John
Firth,John
People associated with Orkney
Firth,John
19th-century Scottish writers
20th-century Scottish writers
Victorian writers